Wegelina is a genus of funguy in the family Calosphaeriaceae containing 7 species.

Species 
 Wegelina cryptomeriae
 Wegelina discreta
 Wegelina grumsiniana
 Wegelina polyporina
 Wegelina saccardoana
 Wegelina sepulta
 Wegelina subdenudata

References

External links 

Sordariomycetes genera
Calosphaeriales